Lists of acronyms contain acronyms, a type of abbreviation formed from the initial components of the words of a longer name or phrase. They are organized alphabetically and by field.

Alphabetical

 List of acronyms: 0–9
 List of acronyms: A
 List of acronyms: B
 List of acronyms: C
 List of acronyms: D
 List of acronyms: E
 List of acronyms: F
 List of acronyms: G
 List of acronyms: H
 List of acronyms: I
 List of acronyms: J
 List of acronyms: K
 List of acronyms: L
 List of acronyms: M
 List of acronyms: N
 List of acronyms: O
 List of acronyms: P
 List of acronyms: Q
 List of acronyms: R
 List of acronyms: S
 List of acronyms: T
 List of acronyms: U
 List of acronyms: V
 List of acronyms: W
 List of acronyms: X
 List of acronyms: Y
 List of acronyms: Z

By topic

 Acronyms and abbreviations in avionics
 List of Aramaic acronyms
 List of astronomy acronyms
 Climate change acronyms
 List of computer science conference acronyms
 List of acronyms associated with the eurozone crisis
 List of government and military acronyms
 Acronyms in healthcare
 List of information technology initialisms
 Laser acronyms
 List of abbreviations in oil and gas exploration and production
 List of geographic acronyms and initialisms
 List of rabbis known by acronyms
 List of U.S. government and military acronyms
 List of waste management acronyms

See also
Lists of abbreviations
List of portmanteaus